Our Tampines Hub (abbreviated as OTH) is an integrated community and lifestyle building in Tampines, Singapore. It is located on the grounds of the former Tampines Stadium and Tampines Sports Hall and is part of the development of the Tampines Regional Centre.  

Built based on feedback from 15,000 residents living in the vicinity, the complex was officially opened by Prime Minister Lee Hsien Loong on 6 August 2017. The current multi-purpose complex replaced the former Tampines Stadium, Tampines Sports Hall, Tampines Swimming Complex, the Housing and Development Board (HDB) Tampines Branch Office and the Tampines Regional Library, housing them under one roof.

History

Our Tampines Hub occupies the grounds of the former sports facilities of Tampines Stadium and Tampines Sports Hall, which was opened in December 1989 in conjunction with the adjacent Tampines Swimming Complex. This coincided with the HDB's plan for opening sporting facilities new housing estates in the late eighties. Tampines Stadium was also the home stadium of the S-League Tampines Rovers Football Club.

Plans for a new proposed integrated lifestyle town hub development to be built on the site of Tampines Stadium and Tampines Sports Hall were unveiled on 21 January 2011, and was part of the Tampines Masterplan for 2011–2015.

On 11 May 2013, a groundbreaking ceremony led by Members of Parliament for Tampines GRC was held at the former Tampines Stadium for what was to be for an integrated-community and sports facility on what was then known as Tampines Town Hub. By July that year, Tampines Stadium had been completely demolished. Construction commenced on 1 June 2014.

The official name of "Tampines Town Hub" was unveiled as Our Tampines Hub on 30 August 2015 with more than 2,000 residents in attendance. Residents also received updates and progress on the features and facilities offered. Residents also had a chance to vote and decide on the hub's logo. OTH opened in three stages, becoming fully operational on 6 August 2017.

Facilities
The building houses six different swimming pools that satisfy families as well as sportspeople, one of which is the largest rooftop pool in Singapore. It also houses a  playground and the Tampines Regional Library.

Public Services Centre
OTH features a Public Services Centre, where residents have access to government services and assistance at a common location. It houses a 24/7 e-service lobby offering services from six different agencies: namely People’s Association, North East Community Development Council, Housing Development Board, Workforce Singapore, Ministry of Social and Family Development, and ActiveSG.

Town Square

Formerly known as Tampines Stadium, the main feature of OTH, the Town Square is a 5,100 seater stadium with a FIFA-endorsed "2 Star Quality Pro football pitch". The artificial turf can be used for both football and rugby matches, and also for other community events.

After 6 years of vacating Tampines Stadium for the construction of OTH, Tampines Rovers Football Club returned to their home ground with much fanfare. The pitch saw its first football match in July 2017, with Tampines Rovers beating Brunei DPMM, 2–0. Tampines Rovers temporarily played at Clementi Stadium and Jurong West Stadium while OTH was under construction.

In 2019, Geylang International FC moved to OTH and shared the stadium as home ground for the club also.

References

2017 establishments in Singapore
Sports venues in Singapore
Football venues in Singapore
Tampines
Shopping malls in Singapore
Multi-purpose stadiums in Singapore
Singapore Premier League venues